Better for America (BFA) is a 501(c)(4) non-profit organization that was dedicated to getting nationwide ballot access for an independent candidate for President of the United States in the 2016 election. The effort was inspired by the unpopularity of the two major party nominees, Donald Trump and Hillary Clinton, and was seen as part of the Stop Trump movement.

The organization's initial strategy was to gain ballot access in states that do not require a candidate to be named, and then name its candidate after the major party conventions. The candidate was planned to be named by an advisory board rather than through traditional primary elections, or through a crowdsourcing effort like the failed Americans Elect effort in the 2012 election.  On August 8, 2016, it was reported that Evan McMullin, an anti-Trump Republican and former Central Intelligence Agency (CIA) official, would be Better for America's nominee. McMullin was officially nominated on August 24.

In July, the organization filed petitions in two states, New Mexico and Arkansas.  By early August, Arkansas had accepted the petition, while New Mexico had rejected the petition because it did not have enough valid signatures, although the New Mexico decision was challenged in court.  On August 22, the organization announced that it was ceasing further ballot access efforts. On September 8, the New Mexico Secretary of State reversed his decision and placed Better For America on the ballot.

Notable people involved in the organization include conservative donor John Kingston III and former New Jersey Governor Christine Todd Whitman. Lawrence Lessig and Randy Barnett expressed their support for the organization in a Time opinion piece.

References

External links
 Official website

2016 United States presidential election
Election and voting-related organizations